Laboratory School, often referred to as Lab School, is the first public boarding school in Nepal. It is located in Kirtipur, Kathmandu. It was established by Tribhuvan University with support from American Embassy as College of Education in 1956. Currently the school is managed under the management of Little Angels School Kathmandu.

Overview
The school follows the curriculum prescribed by the Curriculum Development Centre of Nepal. Besides compulsory subjects a wide choice of subject is offered for the students. The school also has special facilities for Visually Impaired Students.

History 
Laboratory Higher Secondary School is one of the oldest school in Nepal. It was established in 2013 B.S by the Americans at that time.

Gallery

References

Boarding schools in Nepal
1956 establishments in Nepal
Schools in Kathmandu
Educational institutions established in 1956